Hayat Sharara (1935 – August 1, 1997) was an Iraqi writer, translator and educator.

She was born in Najaf. Her family moved to Baghdad in the mid-1940s. Sharara graduated from high school and completed her baccalaureate but could not attend Baghdad University because she was unable to obtain the necessary certificate of good conduct due to her political activism. She was told that she must join the Ba'ath Party if she wished to keep her university job. After she refused, she was transferred to a job as an interpreter for the Ministry of Industry.

She committed suicide in 1997 "to protest the intervention of Baathist intelligence services in university life in Baghdad, and also protest against the economic embargo imposed on Iraq after the first Gulf War". Her daughter Maha committed suicide at the same time.

Her semi-autobiographical novel Idha al-Ayyam Aghsaqat ("When darkness falls"), which she completed shortly before her death, was published in 2000.

References 

1935 births
1997 deaths
Iraqi women writers
Iraqi writers
Iraqi translators
Suicides in Iraq
20th-century translators
1997 suicides
Iraqi communists
People from Najaf
Iraqi people of Lebanese descent
Iraqi academics